James Philander Campbell, Jr. (April 9, 1917 – June 22, 1998) was an American pilot, farmer, government official, and politician from Georgia.

Campbell was born in Athens, Georgia and graduated from Athens High School in 1934. He received his bachelor's degree in agriculture from the University of Georgia.

Career 
Campbell served in the United States Army Air Forces during World War II. He was a pilot and bombardier and was commissioned a first lieutenant in the United States Army. After the war, Campbell owned a farm in Oconee County, Georgia. Campbell served in the Georgia House of Representatives from 1948 to 1954 and was a Democrat. He then served as Georgia Commissioner of Agriculture from 1954 to 1969. In 1968, Campbell switched to the Republican Party. Campbell served as Under Secretary in the United States Department of Agriculture from 1969 to 1975 during the Nixon and Ford Administrations. He then worked for Gold Kist as a consultant.

References

External links

1917 births
1998 deaths
Politicians from Athens, Georgia
People from Oconee County, Georgia
United States Army Air Forces pilots
University of Georgia alumni
Farmers from Georgia (U.S. state)
Georgia (U.S. state) Democrats
Georgia (U.S. state) Republicans
Members of the Georgia House of Representatives
Georgia (U.S. state) Commissioners of Agriculture
United States Under Secretaries of Agriculture
Ford administration personnel
Nixon administration personnel

20th-century American politicians